Harlan Greene (born June 19, 1953) is an American writer and historian. He has published both fiction and non-fiction works. He won the Lambda Literary Award for Gay Fiction for his 1991 novel What the Dead Remember.

Early life
Born in 1953 in Charleston, South Carolina, Greene's parents were Holocaust survivors who moved to Charleston after World War II.

Career
Greene is an author and historian. He has published both fiction and non-fiction works. He won the Lambda Literary Award for Gay Fiction for his 1991 novel What the Dead Remember, and was nominated for the same award for his 2005 novel The German Officer's Boy.

In addition to his writing, Greene has worked as an archivist for the College of Charleston, including collecting materials relating to Jewish history in the Charleston region.

Personal life
Openly gay, Greene spent several years living in Chapel Hill, North Carolina in early adulthood, with his then-partner Olin Jolley. Greene and Jolley are featured in the anthology Two Hearts Desire: Gay Couples on their Love, originally published in 1997, and republished in digital format in 2017. Greene now lives in Charleston with his partner Jonathan Ray.

Works

Fiction
Why We Never Danced the Charleston (1985, 978–0140082180)
What the Dead Remember (1991)
The German Officer's Boy (2005)

Non-fiction
Charleston: City of Memory (1987)
Mr. Skylark: John Bennett and the Charleston Renaissance (2001)
Renaissance in Charleston: Art and Life in the Carolina Low Country, 1900-1940 (2003)
Slave Badges and the Slave-Hire System in Charleston, South Carolina, 1783-1865 (2004)
Cornices of Charleston (2005)
The Damned Don't Cry -- They Just Disappear: The Life and Works of Harry Hervey (2018)

References

1953 births
American male novelists
American short story writers
20th-century American novelists
21st-century American novelists
American gay writers
Jewish American novelists
American LGBT novelists
LGBT Jews
Writers from Charleston, South Carolina
Living people
Lambda Literary Award for Gay Fiction winners
LGBT historians
LGBT people from South Carolina
21st-century American historians
American archivists
American male short story writers
20th-century American male writers
21st-century American male writers
Novelists from South Carolina
20th-century American non-fiction writers
21st-century American non-fiction writers
American male non-fiction writers
21st-century American Jews